Postal is a series of shooter video games created by Running with Scissors known for its high use violence and off-color humor. The games are in various genres, including top-down shooter (Postal), first-person shooter (Postal 2 and Postal 4: No Regerts), and third-person shooter (Postal III). The series has spawned several spin-off games and other media, including an eponymous film adaptation by Uwe Boll.

Games

Main series

Spin-offs

Film 

A film adaptation of the Postal series was directed and co-written by Uwe Boll. Though the film shares the title of the first Postal video game, it is more heavily drawn from the sequel, Postal 2. New characters are introduced in the film, such as Faith (Jackie Tohn), a young barista who joins the Postal Dude in his adventure, and former U.S. president George W. Bush (Brent Mendenhall).

Books 
Two books were published only in Russia. In 2011 published book Postal. Реальный Чувак (Real Dude), which was written by Andrei Shlyachov and published by AST. In 2012 published book Postal. Чувак и надувная свобода (Dude and inflatable freedom), which was written by Igor Gradov and published by AST.

A book based on the first Postal game in the series, named after the game's expansion pack, Postal: Special Delivery, was written by Alisa Bogodarova and published on October 29, 2015, by Publish Green in the form of an Amazon Kindle eBook. The book retells the game's story and the various events leading up to it and introduces several new characters including the Postal Dude's high school friends and teachers as well as original fantasy characters.

On April 15, 2020, a documentary book about the franchise was published – Postal – written by Brock Wilbur and Nathan Rabin, which included an interview with Vince Desi and Mike Jaret.

See also 
 Hatred (video game)

References 

 
Obscenity controversies in video games
Video game franchises
Video game franchises introduced in 1997
Single-player video games
Video games developed in the United States
Metafictional video games
Indie video games
Surreal comedy
Satirical video games